West was a wolfpack of German U-boats that operated during the World War II Battle of the Atlantic from 8 May 1941 to 20 June 1941.

This wolfpack was responsible for sinking 33 ships and damaging a further four ships, making it one of the most successful wolfpacks of World War II.

Raiding Summary

U-Boats

Of the 23 U-boat commanders, 19 were either, or went on to become, recipients of the Knight’s Cross of the Iron Cross.

References

Wolfpacks of 1941